In size theory, the natural pseudodistance between two size pairs ,  is the value , where  varies in the set of all homeomorphisms from the manifold  to the manifold  and  is the supremum norm.

The concept of natural pseudodistance can be easily extended to size pairs where the measuring function  takes values in 
. Lower bounds and approximations of the natural pseudodistance with respect to the group  can be obtained both by means of -invariant persistent homology and by combining classical persistent homology with the use of G-equivariant non-expansive operators.

Main properties
It can be proved 
that the natural pseudodistance always equals the Euclidean distance between two critical values of the measuring functions (possibly, of the same measuring function) divided by a suitable positive integer .
If an optimal homeomorphism  exists (i.e.), then  can be assumed to be . The research concerning optimal homeomorphisms is still at its very beginning
.

See also
 Fréchet distance
 Size function
 Size functor
 Size homotopy group

References

Differential geometry